Three Minute Moments is a 2007 British comedy feature film about speed dating. It was directed by Don Allen and written by Hari Patience. Three Minute Moments stars Katherine Heath, Giles Alderson, Philip Hayden, Naomi Martin and Belinda Lang who has an illustrious career in theatre and on television. The film follows three characters – Lucy, Emmett and Alicia – through their day and what inspires them to go speed dating.  Because of the subject matter, there are more than 50 actors in the film. It highlights dates that you really wouldn't like to have.

Cast and characters

Main characters
Lucy - Katherine Heath
Emmett - Philip Hayden
Alicia - Naomi Martin
Esther - Belinda Lang
Joel - Giles Alderson

Other characters
Bob - Dominic Fowler
Maxie - Anita Clements
Bianka - Dawn Salva
Alan - Daniel Landau
Johnny - James Fisher
Layla - Gabrielle Amies
Ishmael - Joey Jeetun
Cathy - Kathryn Camsey
Marcus - Paul Marcus Davis
Peppar - Emma Jerrold
Donna - Elle-Louise Berrie
Kerri - Manolis Emmanouel 
Roxanne - Gillian MacGregor
Dean - Rod Hunt
Paul - Richard Fry
Sunny - Elizabeth Cooper
Trish - Kirsty Aarden
Tom - Nathan Guy
Daisy - Victoria Miller
Maja - Ana Valencia
Christian - Stephen Butterton
Eleanor - Victoria Kruger
Jason - Graeme Bunce
Nathan - Nicholas Osmond
Dave - Mark Plonsky

External links

Official website
at BritFilms
at  All about Cinema
Christopher Barnett: score composer

2007 films
British comedy films
2007 comedy films
2007 directorial debut films
2000s English-language films
2000s British films